By-elections to the 4th State Duma of the Russian Federation were held to fill vacant seats in the State Duma between the 2003 election and the 2007 election.

External links
Состав Государственной Думы четвертого созыва

2004 elections in Russia
2005 elections in Russia
2006 elections in Russia
 4
4th State Duma of the Russian Federation